The men's +105 kg competition of the weightlifting events at the 2011 Pan American Games in Guadalajara, Mexico, was held on October 27 at the Weightlifting Forum.  The defending champion was Cristián Escalante from Chile. Escalante was scheduled to compete, however withdrew after testing positive for drugs.

Each lifter performed in both the snatch and clean and jerk lifts, with the final score being the sum of the lifter's best result in each. The athlete received three attempts in each of the two lifts; the score for the lift was the heaviest weight successfully lifted. This weightlifting event was the heaviest men's event at the weightlifting competition, limiting competitors to unlimited amount of kilograms of body mass.

Schedule
All times are Central Standard Time (UTC-6).

Results
10 athletes from 10 countries took part.
PR – Pan American Games record

New records
The following records were established and improved upon during the competition.

References

External links
Weightlifting schedule

Weightlifting at the 2011 Pan American Games